Ernst-Günther Baade (20 August 1897 – 8 May 1945) was a German general during World War II. He was a recipient of the Knight's Cross of the Iron Cross with Oak Leaves and Swords of Nazi Germany. Baade was wounded in action and died from his injuries on 8 May 1945.

Career
Ernst-Günther Baade volunteered for military service in 1914 and fought during World War I. During World War II, in March 1942 Baade was assigned to the active reserve of officers (Führerreserve). He subsequently transferred to the 15th Panzer Division in North Africa and took command of the 115th Rifle Regiment on 15 April 1942, at that time committed to action in Libya and Cyrenaica.

Baade became a legend in the Afrika Korps and was known to go into battle dressed in a Scottish kilt and carrying a claymore, a double-edged broadsword. In May 1942 he took part in the Battle of Bir Hakeim. Baade was awarded the Knight's Cross of the Iron Cross for his actions during the battle. He was wounded on 28 July 1942 at El-Alamein, and evacuated to Germany.

During the evacuation of German forces from Sicily to the Italian mainland in early August 1943, Baade was placed in charge of the force defending the Straits of Messina. Baade commanded the 90th Infantry Division in the Battle of Monte Cassino. He was known for his occasionally eccentric behavior, his very small staff, and his frequent front-line inspection visits, all of which made him popular with his troops. He was awarded a Tank Destruction Badge for the single-handed destruction of an enemy tank with an infantry weapon.

Baade was wounded on 24 April 1945, when his staff car was strafed by a British fighter aircraft near Neverstaven in Holstein. He died of gangrene in a hospital at Bad Segeberg on 8 May 1945.

Awards
 Wound Badge in Black (1 July 1918)
 Wehrmacht Long Service Award 2nd Class (2 October 1936)
 German Cross in Gold on 2 November 1941 as Oberstleutnant in the I./Reiter-Regiment 22
 Iron Cross (1914) 2nd Class (25 November 1916) & 1st Class (24 December 1917)
 Clasp to the Iron Cross (1939)  2nd Class (18 September 1939) & 1st Class (5 June 1940)
 Knight's Cross of the Iron Cross with Oak Leaves and Swords
 Knight's Cross on 27 June 1942 as Oberst and commander of Schützen-Regiment 115
 Oak Leaves on 22 February 1944 as Oberst and leader of the 90. Panzergrenadier-Division
 Swords on 16 November 1944 as Generalleutnant and commander of the 90. Panzergrenadier-Division

Footnotes and references

Citations

Bibliography

 
 
 
 
 
 
 
 

1897 births
1945 deaths
People from Pritzwalk
People from the Province of Brandenburg
Lieutenant generals of the German Army (Wehrmacht)
German Army personnel of World War I
German Army personnel killed in World War II
Recipients of the Gold German Cross
Recipients of the Knight's Cross of the Iron Cross with Oak Leaves and Swords
Recipients of the clasp to the Iron Cross, 1st class
Prussian Army personnel
Deaths from gangrene
Infectious disease deaths in Germany
Deaths by airstrike during World War II
Military personnel from Brandenburg